Alfonsas Andriuškevičius (born November 18, 1940, in Vilkaviškis, Lithuania) is a poet and art historian. He received the Lithuanian National Prize in 2007 for essay Rašymas dūmais (Writing with Smoke, 2004) and collection of art critique Lietuvių dailė 1975-1995 (Lithuanian Art 1975-1995, 1997).

Andriuškevičius graduated from Vilnius University in 1965, and went on to explore a variety of disciplines, including ethnography and philosophy. from 1974 to 1990 worked at Lithuanian Academy of Sciences. He taught the Russian language, lectured at the Vilnius Academy of Art from 1989 to 2009. His publications include several books of art criticism, four poetry collections, and a collection of thirty essays.

Selected works 
 Rašymas dūmais, 2004
 Grožis ir menas lietuvių estetikoje 1918–1940, 1989
 33 eilėraščiai, 1994
 66 eilėraščiai, 1998
 Eilėraščiai, 2000
 Lietuvių dailė 1975–1995, 1997

References

External links
Concealed in Smoke. The Vilnius magazine Review
Poems from 22-ių naujų eilėraščių 

1940 births
Living people
People from Vilkaviškis
Lithuanian male poets
Recipients of the Lithuanian National Prize
Lithuanian art historians
Vilnius University alumni
Academic staff of the Vilnius Academy of Arts
Members of the Seimas